Volsellituba is a genus of monogeneans belonging to the family Ancyrocephalidae (sometimes considered as belonging to the Dactylogyridae).

Host and Species

The three known species of the genus are parasitic on the gills of the yellowfin goatfish Mulloidichthys vanicolensis (Mullidae) and were collected in the waters of the Pacific Ocean off New Caledonia.

The following species are considered valid according to WorRMS:
 Volsellituba elephantina Řehulková, Justine & Gelnar, 2010
 Volsellituba nabla Rehulková, Justine & Gelnar, 2010
 Volsellituba orchidea Rehulková, Justine & Gelnar, 2010 (type-species)

References

Ancyrocephalidae
Monogenea genera